Ignacio Vázquez may refer to:

 Ignacio Vázquez (footballer, born 1971), Mexican forward
 Ignacio Vázquez (footballer, born 1997), Argentine defender